The University of Southern Somalia is a higher education center based in Baidoa, Somalia.

History
After a considerable planning stage, the institution was established in 2007 by a group of Somali scholars and intellectuals. Inaugural classes began the following year, in August 2008. University representatives concurrently announced plans to develop four colleges: the College of Science, Agriculture, and Engineering, the College of Social Science, the College of Education, the College of Health and Environmental Sciences, and the College of Jurisprudence. Additionally, an Institute of Social Research is being developed. Plans are also in the works to construct a new campus in an area around 15 km north of Baidoa, as well as two new branches in two other principal cities in the Bay region.

Programs
The university has plans to install over 20 degree programs. However the initial programs are as listed below.

College of Education
College of Science, Agriculture, and Engineering
College of Health and Environmental Sciences
College of Jurisprudence
College of Social Sciences
School of Management and Economics
Institute of Research and Training (IRT)

References

Universities in Somalia
2007 establishments in Somalia
Educational institutions established in 2007